Sabrina Dickens is a former British actress and model, best known for her leading dual role as Reiga and Celine in My Lonely Me and leading role in Is This Now. She now pursues another career in the animal care industry. 
After her training at the University of South Wales in 2011, she then launched her professional career with leading and supporting roles in a number of independent films. Her modeling career included front cover and page spread shoots for publications such as Model Doodle magazine, Haunted After Dark magazine and the South Wales Echo official shopping catalog.
Sabrina has won numerous awards for her performances in My Lonely Me and Is This Now.

Theatre
 Grand Guignol, by Richard Hand as Helen Abertoir.
 A Life Time On Tip Toes, by Dominique Fester as Ensemble Chapter Arts Centre.

Filmography

Films

Awards and nominations

References

External links

Living people
British film actresses
English television actresses
Year of birth missing (living people)